Henry Watterson Hull (October 3, 1890 – March 8, 1977) was an American character actor perhaps best known for playing the lead in Universal Pictures's Werewolf of London (1935). For most of his career, he was a lead actor on stage and a character actor on screen.

Early years
Hull was born in Louisville, Kentucky, the youngest of four children born to William Madison Hull, a theater manager and his wife, Elinor Bond Vaughn. He was named for his godfather, Pulitzer Prize-winning Louisville journalist Henry Watterson.

William Hull had been a drama critic in Louisville, and became a press agent for David Belasco after the family moved to New York City in 1902. Hull attended DeWitt Clinton High School and the High School of Commerce. Hull studied engineering at Columbia and was graduated from Cooper Union. In 1910, the family settled in Barkhamsted, Connecticut.

Career

Stage
Impressed by his brother Shelly's acting career, in 1912, Henry joined the Greek Repertory Company run by his sister-in-law, Margaret Anglin, who was married to his brother Howard. Anglin's touring company specialized in productions of Greek tragedies. In 1913, he returned to New York City to appear on Broadway in John Frederick Ballard's Believe Me, Xantippe with John Barrymore.

Early in his career, Hull appeared frequently on Broadway. In 1916, Hull and his wife, Juliet Fremont, appeared in The Man Who Came Back at the Playhouse Theatre. The play was very successful and ran for more than a year. In 1919, he was at the Broadhurst Theatre in 39 East with Tallulah Bankhead.

Hull created the role of Jeeter Lester in the long-running play Tobacco Road (1933), based on the novel by Erskine Caldwell. In 1956, Hull toured in a one-man show, doing readings from the works of Mark Twain.  Hull had met Twain in Louisville when visiting Henry Watterson.

Film

 
Hull appeared in 74 films between 1917 and 1966, often playing supporting characters such as the uncle of Tyrone Power's love interest Nancy Kelly in Jesse James (1939). He appeared as Charles Rittenhouse, a wealthy industrialist in Alfred Hitchcock's Lifeboat (1944). Some of his other notable roles were as Abel Magwitch in the 1934 version of Great Expectations and in the last film of director Tod Browning, Miracles for Sale (1939). He starred in Werewolf of London in 1935. 

Henry Hull played the role of aging architect Henry Cameron (the mentor to Howard Roark) in The Fountainhead. Hull memorably portrayed a doctor to whom Humphrey Bogart goes for help in High Sierra, and was also cast in Colorado Territory, a Western remake of the High Sierra story starring Joel McCrea. He played a desert prospector who comes to Robert Ryan's rescue in Inferno in 1953.

He guest-starred on CBS's Appointment with Adventure, John Payne's NBC Western series titled The Restless Gun, and the syndicated crime drama U.S. Marshal. In 1958, he was featured in Robert Culp's Western series, Trackdown as Moss in the episode "Three Legged Fox". In 1959, he played the part of Obadiah on Wagon Train, season two, episode 14, "The Kitty Angel Story".

In 1960, Hull appeared on Bonanza twice, in the episode "The Gunmen" as Sheriff B. Banneman, and a scout for General John Charles Fremont (who, in real life, was the grandfather of Hull's wife) in the episode "The Mission".

On December 13, 1960, Hull guest-starred on NBC's Laramie as an embittered rancher, Ben Parkinson, who challenges Slim Sherman, played by series star John Smith, to a duel after Parkinson's youngest son accidentally kills himself on Sherman ranch land. Ron Harper portrays Parkinson's other son, Tom. 

Hull also guest-starred in the series finale of Laramie, the episode "The Road to Helena" (May 21, 1963). Series character Slim Sherman, while in Cody, Wyoming, is hired by David Franklin, played by Hull, and his barmaid daughter, Ruth, portrayed by Maggie Pierce, to guide the pair to Helena, Montana, so Franklin can return money that he had previously stolen.  John M. Pickard also appears in this episode. 
 
Hull's last film was The Chase (1966) with Marlon Brando and Robert Redford.

Family

Hull was married to Juliet Van Wyck Fremont from 1913 until her death in 1971. She was a granddaughter of Civil War general and explorer John C. Frémont and Jessie Ann Benton, the daughter of Missouri Senator Thomas Hart Benton. The couple had three children, Henry Jr., Shelley, (named after Henry's late brother) and Joan. When his wife died in 1971, Hull went to Britain to spend his last years with his daughter. He died in Cornwall at his daughter's residence on March 8, 1977. 

Hull had two brothers who were also actors. Howard, the eldest, was married, until his death in 1937, to stage star Margaret Anglin. Henry Hull was quoted as saying he owed all his dramatic training to Anglin, with whom he had acted on stage. The middle brother, Shelley Hull, was a popular leading man who costarred in Why Marry?, the first play to win the Pulitzer Prize for Drama. He fell ill during the run of his biggest hit – the WWI play Under Orders – and died of influenza at 34 on January 14, 1919, during the Spanish influenza epidemic. Shelley's widow, Josephine Hull (1877–1957), was a successful stage performer throughout her long life and became an Oscar-winning character actress.

Filmography

References

External links

 
 
 Henry Hull at preservehollywood.org
 "Henry Hull", Internet Broadway Database

1890 births
1977 deaths
20th-century American male actors
American male film actors
American male silent film actors

Male actors from New York City
Male actors from Los Angeles
Male actors from Louisville, Kentucky